Anyidi is a Payam in Bor East County, in Jonglei State, South Sudan.  It is situated to the east of Bor, the capital of Jonglei State, on the road connecting Bor and Pibor, in Boma State.

History
During September, 2016, Anyidi was the site of the Anyidi Peace Conference, which established a joint police force for Boma State and Jonglei State to prevent cattle raiding and child abductions.

Demographics
Anyidi is composed of three bomas.  These are  Thianwei,  Chuei Magon and  Mareng.  According to the Fifth Population and Housing Census of Sudan, conducted in April 2008, Anyidi had a combined population of 24,882 people, composed of 13,164 male and 11,718 female residents.

Anyidi is home to the Palek community.

Notes

References 

Geography of South Sudan
Jonglei State
Subdivisions of South Sudan